Rogelio Juan Blaín Blaín; 24 August 1944 – 13 May 2018) was a Cuban actor of radio, television, and film. He has received many awards through his career, including the Cuban Radio and Television Praiseworthy Artist.

Early life and career
Blaín was born in Havana in 1944. He started as an amateur actor. In 1966, Humberto Solás, who had had success with Manuela, was looking for actors to film Lucía, and he selected Blaín to become part of the cast. He played an important role in the film: second part of the film's Antonio.

He took part on the cast of the Cuban Television, although he has stated that he prefers doing films because that has paved him the way. On stage he met his colleagues and friends Enrique Molina and Enrique Almirante, who share stage in several times. As for 2013, Blaín takes part in Cuban television series S.O.S Academia (S.O.S Academy).

Selected filmography

References

1944 births
2018 deaths
20th-century Cuban male actors
Male actors from Havana
21st-century Cuban male actors
Cuban male film actors
Cuban male stage actors
Cuban male television actors